Arkansas Traveler is an American indie Western web series written by American actor and screenwriter, Sean Bridgers, and co-directed with Michael Hemschoot. The series cast includes, Garret Dillahunt, Angela Bettis and Bridgers. It premiered on Digital distribution platforms YouTube and Vimeo on June 14, 2017 with the first of six episodes, "Enter the Traveler"

Cast

Production
In 2010 the filmmakers produced an original teaser for a feature film based on Bridger's screenplay with the web series cast. Principal photography was conducted in and around Kansas City. Post production for the teaser and also the re-packaging of the footage as the 2017 web series was conducted by Michael Hemschoot in Travelin Production's Colorado facilities. The resulting 10-minute series was shown at the 2010 Little Rock Film Festival.

Bridgers' original screenplay for the feature film the series is based on has received praise from the series star, Garret Dillahunt, who said, "I think it is one of the most beautiful scripts I've read in the passed decade." Fellow Deadwood cast member, Ray McKinnon also said it was one of the best un-produced scripts he's read in the past decade.

In a 2017 interview, Bridgers said Travelin' Productions is working towards making Arkansas Traveler a feature film or to continue the web series.

Episodes

Reception
Sam Gutelle, reviewed the series for Tubefilter, writing: "Thanks to its smooth-talking, whiskey-drinking, gun-slinging elements, Arkansas Traveler contains everything it needs to appeal to the western fans who are its target audience. At the same time, its washed out, low-lit style brings something new to the genre..."

Laura Beck, in The Village Voice, included the series in her "...TV Not to Miss..." piece, writing: "...this Civil War–era tale stars the ever-wonderful Garret Dillahunt and Angela Bettis alongside [Sean] Bridgers, and it’s got tons of gun slinging and whiskey drinking, as you might expect from a production with serious Deadwood roots. I have a feeling this will appeal to fans of the departed HBO series and it’s flying a bit under the radar, so consider this a PSA to watch it ASAP."

External links
 
 The Denver Egotist | Arkansas Traveler: A Western Web Series – Via Colorado's Travelin' Productions
 The Denver Egotist | Arkansas Traveler: A Western Web Series Continues – Via Colorado's Travelin' Productions
 Garret Dillahunt Official Site – Arkansas Traveler is back as a web series
 Arkansas Traveler on hypeSCREEN
 A destiny at the barrel of a gun - Review on webseriesmag.tv

References

American drama web series
2017 web series debuts
Western (genre) web series
Works set in the 19th century
Works set in the 1860s